Fauna in Armenia is diverse given the country's relatively small geographic size, owing to the varied habitats created by the area's mountainous terrain. Armenia is an important area for migratory animals, about 350 different bird species were recorded in the country. Many of the world's domesticated animals originated in the area Armenia is located in, and the mouflon, the ancestor of domesticated sheep, is present there. Research suggests that about a quarter of the animal species in Armenia are internationally endangered. The mouflon are suffering a great population decline due to poaching and habitat loss, and the Sevan trout, which made up thirty percent of the fish in Lake Sevan, have virtually disappeared.

Felidae 
Southern and south-western Armenia remains the last stronghold for survival of the Persian leopard in the whole Caucasus, in part due to its connectivity with Iran where the main portion of the Persian leopard population exists. The total population size in Armenia numbers no more than 10-20 individuals, including adults, sub adults and cubs. Special calculations were not carried out. By fragmentary data, population in Armenia is accounted not more than 25 individuals.

Before being hunted to extinction in the Trans-Caucasus in the 10th Century, the Asiatic lion used to occur in the region of Yerevan and the Araks River.

See also
 Sevan trout
 Geography of Armenia
 Wildlife of Armenia

References

 "Krasnaya kniga Armyanskoi SSR, zhivotnye." 1987. Yerevan, Hayastan.
 Kurkjian R. 1999. "Out of Stone. Armenia. Artsakh." Stone Garden Productions, Washington, DC.

External links
 List of Freshwater Fishes for Armenia
 Extinct Armenian Animals
 Fauna in Armenia